The 2021 Frisco Bowl was a college football bowl game played on December 21, 2021, with kickoff at 7:30 p.m. EST (6:30 p.m. local CST) on ESPN. It was the 4th edition of the Frisco Bowl (after the 2020 edition was cancelled due to the COVID-19 pandemic), and was one of the 2021–22 bowl games concluding the 2021 FBS football season. Sponsored by restaurant franchise Tropical Smoothie Cafe, the game was officially known as the Tropical Smoothie Cafe Frisco Bowl.

Teams
Consistent with conference tie-ins, the game was played between teams from the Group of Five conferences.

This was the first time that San Diego State and UTSA had played each other.

UTSA Roadrunners

The Roadrunners, from Conference USA (C-USA), finished the regular season with a record of 11–1, 7–1 in conference play. The team won the West Division, advancing to the C-USA Championship Game, defeating Western Kentucky 49–41 for the program's first conference championship. UTSA entered the game ranked no. 24 in the AP Poll and no. 25 in the Coaches Poll. The team was led by second year head coach Jeff Traylor.

San Diego State Aztecs

The Aztecs, from the Mountain West Conference (MW), finished the regular season with a record of 11–1, 7–1 in conference play. The Aztecs won the West Division and made the MW Championship Game, losing 13–46 to Utah State. The team entered the game ranked no. 24 in the CFP poll. The Aztecs were led by head coach Brady Hoke.

Game summary

Statistics

See also
2021 Frisco Football Classic, played at the same venue two days later

References

External links
 Game statistics at statbroadcast.com

Frisco Bowl
Frisco Bowl
San Diego State Aztecs football bowl games
UTSA Roadrunners football bowl games
Frisco Bowl
Frisco Bowl